Carla Camacho Carrillo (born 2 May 2005) is a Spanish footballer who plays as a forward for Real Madrid.

Club career
Camacho started her senior career with Real Madrid. Camacho made her first team debut against Eibar, coming on as a substitute for Caroline Møller in the 87th minute of the match.

References

External links
Profile at La Liga

 

2005 births
Living people
Footballers from Madrid
Spanish women's footballers
Women's association football forwards
Real Madrid Femenino players
Primera División (women) players
Spain women's youth international footballers